{{DISPLAYTITLE:C14H18N2}}
The molecular formula C14H18N2 (molar mass: 214.31 g/mol) may refer to:

 1,8-Bis(dimethylamino)naphthalene
 Ciclindole
 Pyr-T, or N,N-tetramethylenetryptamine
 SN-22

Molecular formulas